The up tack or falsum (⊥, \bot in LaTeX, U+22A5 in Unicode) is a constant symbol used to represent:

 The truth value 'false', or a logical constant denoting a proposition in logic that is always false (often called "falsum" or "absurdum").
 The bottom element in wheel theory and lattice theory, which also represents absurdum when used for logical semantics
 The bottom type in type theory, which is the bottom element in the subtype relation. This may coincide with the empty type, which represents absurdum under the Curry–Howard correspondence
as well as
 Mixed radix decoding in the APL programming language

The glyph of the up tack appears as an upside-down tee symbol, and as such is sometimes called eet (the word "tee" in reverse). Tee plays a complementary or dual role in many of these theories.

The similar-looking perpendicular symbol (⟂, \perp in LaTeX, U+27C2 in Unicode) is a binary relation symbol used to represent:

 Perpendicularity of lines in geometry
 Orthogonality in linear algebra
 Independence of random variables in probability theory
 Coprimality in number theory

The double tack up symbol (⫫, U+2AEB in Unicode) is a constant symbol used to represent:

 Conditional independence of random variables in probability theory

See also 
Alternative plus sign
 Contradiction
 List of mathematical symbols
 Tee (symbol) (⊤)
 Verum

Notes 

Mathematical notation
Mathematical symbols
Logic symbols